The 2020–21 Los Angeles Lakers season was the franchise's 74th season, its 73rd season in the National Basketball Association (NBA), its 61st season in Los Angeles, and their 22nd season playing home games at Staples Center. The Lakers were coached by Frank Vogel in his second year as head coach. The Lakers played their home games at Staples Center as members of the Western Conference's Pacific Division. The Lakers entered the season as the defending Pacific Division, Western Conference, and NBA champions.

On November 10, 2020, the NBA announced that the 2020–21 season would begin on December 22, 2020, following the delayed finish to the 2019–20 season due to the ongoing COVID-19 pandemic. Each team was to play a shortened 72-game schedule. A week later, the NBA announced the format for the season which would include a play-in tournament to determine the seventh and eighth seeds in each conference. The second half of the schedule would not be announced until a later date to allow for the makeup of any games postponed due to COVID-19 issues.

The season began just 72 days after the completion of the 2020 finals, giving the Lakers and the Miami Heat the shortest off-season in league history. In February 2021, the Lakers had the second best record in the West at 21–7, two games behind the Utah Jazz, when Anthony Davis suffered a strained calf that sidelined him for 30 games. One game after Davis was injured, Dennis Schröder missed a span of four games, in which the Lakers were winless, due to the league's health and safety protocols. LeBron James missed 26 of the team's final 30 games with a sprained ankle. After Davis returned from his nine-week absence, the Lakers were 35–23, going 14–16 without him, including 6–10 with James out as well.  Schröder also missed seven games in the final weeks of the season, again due to health and safety protocols.

In an injury-laden season, the Lakers finished with a 42–30 record (roughly the equivalent of 48–34), the same as the No. 5 Mavericks and No. 6 Trail Blazers; they fell to 7th place due to tiebreakers, resulting in the Lakers having to face the No. 8 Warriors in the play-in tournament, whom they defeated to secure the No. 7 seed in the playoffs. This was the first time in James's career that he did not have home court advantage in the first round of the playoffs. Against the second-seeded Phoenix Suns in the opening round, they were up 2–1 when Davis suffered a strained groin in Game 4. The Lakers were eliminated in six games, the first time in James's career that his team exited in the first round of the playoffs and the first defending NBA champion that was eliminated in the first round of the playoffs since the 2014–15 San Antonio Spurs.

Previous season 

The Lakers finished the 2019–20 season 52–19 to finish in 1st place in the Pacific Division and the Western Conference. In the playoffs, they defeated the Portland Trail Blazers, Houston Rockets, and Denver Nuggets each in five games to advance to the NBA Finals for the first time since 2010. There they defeated the Miami Heat (LeBron's former team) in six games to earn the franchise's 17th NBA championship.

Offseason

Draft
 

 This was a traded pick with the Oklahoma City Thunder that sent Danny Green and the draft rights to Jaden McDaniels to the Thunder in return for Dennis Schröder.

 Before the start of the 2020 NBA draft period, the Lakers' first-round selection was held stuck as the 29th pick of the draft with their record being the second-best of all NBA teams behind the Milwaukee Bucks the prior season at 49–14 before the NBA suspended their season on March 12, 2020. However, the Lakers did resume their season in the 2020 NBA Bubble, eventually winning their 17th championship there against the Miami Heat, leaving them a chance to move their first-round pick up or down for the 2020 draft. In the bubble, the Toronto Raptors ended up finishing with a better overall record than the Lakers, moving their first-round pick to the 28th selection instead, though still finishing as the best Western Conference team that season. The Lakers only held one first-round selection for this draft, as they traded their second-round pick to the Orlando Magic for the draft rights to Talen Horton-Tucker in last season's draft.

Preseason

Game log 

|-style="background:#cfc"
| 1
| December 11
| L.A. Clippers
| 
| Talen Horton-Tucker (19)
| Montrezl Harrell (12)
| Kyle Kuzma (5)
| Staples Center0
| 1–0
|-style="background:#cfc"
| 2
| December 13
| L.A. Clippers
| 
| Talen Horton-Tucker (33)
| Montrezl Harrell (11)
| Quinn Cook (7)
| Staples Center0
| 2–0
|-style="background:#cfc"
| 3
| December 16
| @ Phoenix
| 
| Kyle Kuzma (23)
| Marc Gasol (8)
| Quinn Cook (4)
| PHX Arena0
| 3–0
|-style="background:#cfc"
| 4
| December 18
| @ Phoenix
| 
| Anthony Davis (35)
| LeBron James (8)
| Gasol, James (4)
| PHX Arena0
| 4–0

Regular season

Standings

Division

Conference

Notes
 z – Clinched home court advantage for the entire playoffs
 c – Clinched home court advantage for the conference playoffs
 y – Clinched division title
 x – Clinched playoff spot
 pb – Clinched play-in spot
 o – Eliminated from playoff contention
 * – Division leader

Game log

|-style="background:#fcc;"
| 1
| December 22
| L. A. Clippers
| 
| LeBron James (22)
| Dennis Schröder (12)
| Dennis Schröder (8)
| Staples Center0
| 0–1
|-style="background:#cfc"
| 2
| December 25
| Dallas
| 
| Anthony Davis (28)
| Marc Gasol (9)
| LeBron James (10)
| Staples Center0
| 1–1
|-style="background:#cfc"
| 3
| December 27
| Minnesota
| 
| Kyle Kuzma (20)
| LeBron James (9)
| Marc Gasol (8)
| Staples Center0
| 2–1
|-style="background:#fcc
| 4
| December 28
| Portland
| 
| LeBron James (29)
| Anthony Davis (10)
| LeBron James (6)
| Staples Center0
| 2–2
|-style="background:#cfc
| 5
| December 30
| @ San Antonio
| 
| LeBron James (26)
| Montrezl Harrell (9)
| LeBron James (8)
| AT&T Center0
| 3–2

|-style="background:#cfc
| 6
| January 1
| @ San Antonio
| 
| Anthony Davis (34)
| Davis, James, Harrell (11)
| LeBron James (10)
| AT&T Center0
| 4–2
|-style="background:#cfc
| 7
| January 3
| @ Memphis
| 
| LeBron James (22)
| LeBron James (13)
| LeBron James (8)
| FedEx Forum0
| 5–2
|-style="background:#cfc"
| 8
| January 5
| @ Memphis
| 
| Davis, James (26)
| LeBron James (11)
| LeBron James (7)
| FedEx Forum0
| 6–2
|-style="background:#fcc"
| 9
| January 7
| San Antonio
| 
| LeBron James (27)
| Davis, Kuzma (10)
| LeBron James (12)
| Staples Center0
| 6–3
|-style="background:#cfc"
| 10
| January 8
| Chicago
| 
| LeBron James (28)
| Montrezl Harrell (14)
| LeBron James (7)
| Staples Center0
| 7–3
|-style="background:#cfc"
| 11
| January 10
| @ Houston
| 
| Anthony Davis (27)
| Montrezl Harrell (8)
| James, Schröder (7)
| Toyota Center0
| 8–3
|-style="background:#cfc
| 12
| January 12
| @ Houston
| 
| LeBron James (26)
| Kyle Kuzma (11)
| Gasol, James (5)
| Toyota Center0
| 9–3
|-style="background:#cfc
| 13
| January 13
| @ Oklahoma City
| 
| LeBron James (26)
| Davis, Morris (7)
| LeBron James (7)
| Chesapeake Energy Arena0
| 10–3
|-style="background:#cfc
| 14
| January 15
| New Orleans
| 
| LeBron James (21)
| Kyle Kuzma (13)
| Lebron James (11)
| Staples Center0
| 11–3
|-style="background:#fcc
| 15
| January 18
| Golden State
| 
| Dennis Schröder (25)
| Anthony Davis (17)
| Anthony Davis (7)
| Staples Center0
| 11–4
|-style="background:#cfc
| 16
| January 21
| @ Milwaukee
| 
| LeBron James (34)
| Anthony Davis (9)
| LeBron James (8)
| Fiserv Forum0
| 12–4
|-style="background:#cfc
| 17
| January 23
| @ Chicago
| 
| Anthony Davis (37)
| LeBron James (11)
| LeBron James (6)
| United Center0
| 13–4
|-style="background:#cfc
| 18
| January 25
| @ Cleveland
| 
| LeBron James (46)
| Anthony Davis (10)
| LeBron James (6)
| Rocket Mortgage FieldHouse2,000
| 14–4
|-style="background:#fcc"
| 19
| January 27
| @ Philadelphia
| 
| LeBron James (36)
| Anthony Davis (8)
| LeBron James (7)
| Wells Fargo Center0
| 14–5
|-style="background:#fcc"
| 20
| January 28
| @ Detroit
| 
| James, Kuzma (22)
| Kyle Kuzma (10)
| LeBron James (10)
| Little Caesars Arena0
| 14–6
|-style="background:#cfc
| 21
| January 30
| @ Boston
| 
| Anthony Davis (27)
| Anthony Davis (14)
| James, Schröder (7)
| TD Garden0
| 15–6

|-style="background:#cfc
| 22
| February 1
| @ Atlanta
| 
| Anthony Davis (25)
| LeBron James (7)
| LeBron James (9)
| State Farm Arena1,341
| 16–6
|-style="background:#cfc
| 23
| February 4
| Denver
| 
| LeBron James (27)
| LeBron James (10)
| LeBron James (10)
| Staples Center0
| 17–6
|-style="background:#cfc
| 24
| February 6
| Detroit
| 
| LeBron James (33)
| Montrezl Harrell (8)
| LeBron James (11)
| Staples Center0
| 18–6
|-style="background:#cfc"
| 25
| February 8
| Oklahoma City
| 
| LeBron James (28)
| LeBron James (14)
| LeBron James (12)
| Staples Center0
| 19–6
|-style="background:#cfc"
| 26
| February 10
| Oklahoma City
| 
| LeBron James (25)
| Kyle Kuzma (9)
| LeBron James (7)
| Staples Center0
| 20–6
|-style="background:#cfc"
| 27
| February 12
| Memphis
| 
| Anthony Davis (35)
| Kyle Kuzma (10)
| LeBron James (8)
| Staples Center0
| 21–6
|-style="background:#fcc"
| 28
| February 14
| @ Denver
| 
| LeBron James (22)
| LeBron James (10)
| LeBron James (9)
| Ball Arena0
| 21–7
|-style="background:#cfc"
| 29
| February 16
| @ Minnesota
| 
| LeBron James (30)
| LeBron James (13)
| LeBron James (7)
| Target Center0
| 22–7
|-style="background:#fcc"
| 30
| February 18
| Brooklyn
| 
| LeBron James (32)
| Kyle Kuzma (10)
| LeBron James (7)
| Staples Center0
| 22–8
|-style="background:#fcc"
| 31
| February 20
| Miami
| 
| Kyle Kuzma (23)
| Montrezl Harrell (10)
| LeBron James (9)
| Staples Center0
| 22–9
|-style="background:#fcc"
| 32
| February 22
| Washington
| 
| LeBron James (31)
| Kyle Kuzma (11)
| LeBron James (13)
| Staples Center0
| 22–10
|-style="background:#fcc"
| 33
| February 24
| @ Utah
| 
| LeBron James (19)
| Markieff Morris (9)
| Talen Horton-Tucker (5)
| Vivint Arena4,912
| 22–11
|-style="background:#cfc"
| 34
| February 26
| Portland
| 
| LeBron James (28)
| James, Kuzma (11)
| LeBron James (7)
| Staples Center0
| 23–11
|-style="background:#cfc"
| 35
| February 28
| Golden State
| 
| LeBron James (19)
| Kyle Kuzma (11)
| Dennis Schröder (6)
| Staples Center0
| 24–11

|-style="background:#fcc"
| 36
| March 2
| Phoenix
| 
| LeBron James (38)
| Caruso, Morris (6)
| James, Schröder (6)
| Staples Center0
| 24–12
|-style="background:#fcc"
| 37
| March 3
| @ Sacramento
| 
| Dennis Schröder (28)
| Kyle Kuzma (13)
| Dennis Schröder (9)
| Golden 1 Center0
| 24–13
|- style="background:#cfc;"
| 38
| March 12
| Indiana
| 
| Kyle Kuzma (24)
| Kyle Kuzma (13)
| LeBron James (10)
| Staples Center0
| 25–13
|- style="background:#cfc;"
| 39
| March 15
| @ Golden State
| 
| Montrezl Harrell (27)
| LeBron James (10)
| LeBron James (11)
| Chase Center0
| 26–13
|- style="background:#cfc;"
| 40
| March 16
| Minnesota
| 
| Harrell, James (25)
| LeBron James (12)
| LeBron James (12)
| Staples Center0
| 27–13
|- style="background:#cfc;"
| 41
| March 18
| Charlotte
| 
| LeBron James (37)
| Montrezl Harrell (11)
| Dennis Schröder (7)
| Staples Center0
| 28–13
|- style="background:#fcc;"
| 42
| March 20
| Atlanta
| 
| Montrezl Harrell (23)
| Montrezl Harrell (11)
| Horton-Tucker, James, Schröder (4)
| Staples Center0
| 28–14
|- style="background:#fcc;"
| 43
| March 21
| @ Phoenix
| 
| Montrezl Harrell (23)
| Montrezl Harrell (10)
| Kyle Kuzma (6)
| Phoenix Suns Arena3,190
| 28–15
|- style="background:#fcc;"
| 44
| March 23
| @ New Orleans
| 
| Montrezl Harrell (18)
| Kyle Kuzma (10)
| Kuzma, Schröder (7)
| Smoothie King Center3,700
| 28–16
|- style="background:#fcc;"
| 45
| March 25
| Philadelphia
| 
| Kyle Kuzma (25)
| Kyle Kuzma (9)
| Dennis Schröder (11)
| Staples Center0
| 28–17
|- style="background:#cfc;"
| 46
| March 26
| Cleveland
| 
| Montrezl Harrell (24)
| Montrezl Harrell (10)
| Kuzma, Schröder (7)
| Staples Center0
| 29–17
|- style="background:#cfc;"
| 47
| March 28
| Orlando
| 
| Dennis Schröder (24)
| Harrell, Kuzma, Morris (11)
| Dennis Schröder (6)
| Staples Center0
| 30–17
|- style="background:#fcc;"
| 48
| March 31
| Milwaukee
| 
| Montrezl Harrell (19)
| Kyle Kuzma (7)
| Dennis Schröder (8)
| Staples Center0
| 30–18

|- style="background:#cfc;"
| 49
| April 2
| @ Sacramento
| 
| Kyle Kuzma (30)
| Caldwell-Pope, Harrell (10)
| Dennis Schröder (8)
| Golden 1 Center0
| 31–18
|- style="background:#fcc;"
| 50
| April 4
| @ L. A. Clippers
| 
| Montrezl Harrell (19)
| Kyle Kuzma (7)
| Dennis Schröder (7)
| Staples Center0
| 31–19
|- style="background:#cfc;"
| 51
| April 6
| @ Toronto
| 
| Talen Horton-Tucker (17)
| Gasol, Morris (9)
| Dennis Schröder (9)
| Amalie ArenaN/A
| 32–19
|- style="background:#fcc;"
| 52
| April 8
| @ Miami
| 
| Kentavious Caldwell-Pope (28)
| Andre Drummond (12)
| Dennis Schröder (14)
| American Airlines ArenaN/A
| 32–20
|- style="background:#cfc;"
| 53
| April 10
| @ Brooklyn
| 
| Andre Drummond (20)
| Andre Drummond (11)
| Talen Horton-Tucker (11)
| Barclays Center1,773
| 33–20
|- style="background:#fcc;"
| 54
| April 12
| @ New York
| 
| Dennis Schröder (21)
| Andre Drummond (10)
| Dennis Schröder (6)
| Madison Square Garden1,981
| 33–21
|- style="background:#cfc;"
| 55
| April 13
| @ Charlotte
| 
| Kyle Kuzma (24)
| Andre Drummond (12)
| Caruso, Schröder (6)
| Spectrum Center3,676
| 34–21
|- style="background:#fcc;"
| 56
| April 15
| Boston
| 
| Talen Horton-Tucker (19)
| Montrezl Harrell (8)
| Dennis Schröder (8)
| Staples Center1,915
| 34–22
|- style="background:#cfc;"
| 57
| April 17
| Utah
| 
| Andre Drummond (27)
| Markieff Morris (12)
| Dennis Schröder (8)
| Staples Center1,710
| 35–22
|- style="background:#fcc;"
| 58
| April 19
| Utah
| 
| Talen Horton-Tucker (24)
| Andre Drummond (8)
| Dennis Schröder (6)
| Staples Center1,709
| 35–23
|- style="background:#fcc;"
| 59
| April 22
| @ Dallas
| 
| Kentavious Caldwell-Pope (29)
| Andre Drummond (19)
| Dennis Schröder (13)
| American Airlines Center4,443
| 35–24
|- style="background:#fcc;"
| 60
| April 24
| @ Dallas
| 
| Ben McLemore (20)
| Andre Drummond (12)
| Dennis Schröder (10)
| American Airlines Center4,561
| 35–25
|- style="background:#cfc;"
| 61
| April 26
| @ Orlando
| 
| Dennis Schröder (21)
| Andre Drummond (11)
| Dennis Schröder (10)
| Amway Center4,099
| 36–25
|- style="background:#fcc;"
| 62
| April 28
| @ Washington
| 
| Anthony Davis (26)
| Andre Drummond (11)
| Kuzma, Schröder (8)
| Capital One Arena2,133
| 36–26
|- style="background:#fcc;"
| 63
| April 30
| Sacramento
| 
| Anthony Davis (22)
| Anthony Davis (11)
| James, Schröder (7)
| Staples Center2,691
| 36–27

|- style="background:#fcc;"
| 64
| May 2
| Toronto
| 
| Kyle Kuzma (24)
| Andre Drummond (11)
| Davis, Horton-Tucker (7)
| Staples Center2,053
| 36–28
|- style="background:#cfc;"
| 65
| May 3
| Denver
| 
| Anthony Davis (25)
| Caldwell-Pope, Davis, Gasol (7)
| Caruso, Horton-Tucker, Morris (3)
| Staples Center2,454
| 37–28
|- style="background:#fcc;"
| 66
| May 6
| @ L. A. Clippers
| 
| Kyle Kuzma (25)
| Drummond, Harrell (6)
| Alex Caruso (7)
| Staples Center3,275
| 37–29
|- style="background:#fcc;"
| 67
| May 7
| @ Portland
| 
| Anthony Davis (36)
| Anthony Davis (12)
| Caldwell-Pope, Davis (5)
| Moda Center1,939
| 37–30
|- style="background:#cfc;"
| 68
| May 9
| Phoenix
| 
| Anthony Davis (42)
| Anthony Davis (12)
| Alex Caruso (8)
| Staples Center3,144
| 38–30
|- style="background:#cfc;"
| 69
| May 11
| New York
| 
| Kyle Kuzma (23)
| Andre Drummond (18)
| Talen Horton-Tucker (10)
| Staples Center3,550
| 39–30
|- style="background:#cfc;"
| 70
| May 12
| Houston
| 
| Talen Horton-Tucker (23)
| Drummond, Kuzma (10)
| Talen Horton-Tucker (10)
| Staples Center4,087
| 40–30
|- style="background:#cfc;"
| 71
| May 15
| @ Indiana 
| 
| Anthony Davis (28)
| Andre Drummond (15)
| LeBron James (8)
| Bankers Life Fieldhouse0
| 41–30
|- style="background:#cfc;"
| 72
| May 16 
| @ New Orleans
| 
| LeBron James (25)
| Andre Drummond (13)
| Caldwell-Pope, James (6)
| Smoothie King Center3,700
| 42–30

Player stats

Regular season statistics 

*Total with the Lakers only

Play-in

|- style="background:#cfc"
| 1
| May 19
| Golden State
| 
| Anthony Davis (25)
| Anthony Davis (12)
| LeBron James (10)
| Staples Center6,022
| 1–0

Playoffs

Game log 

|-style="background:#fcc;"
| 1
| May 23
| @ Phoenix
| 
| LeBron James (18)
| Andre Drummond (9)
| LeBron James (10)
| Phoenix Suns Arena11,824
| 0–1
|-style="background:#cfc;"
| 2
| May 25
| @ Phoenix
| 
| Anthony Davis (34)
| Andre Drummond (12)
| LeBron James (9)
| Phoenix Suns Arena11,919
| 1–1
|-style="background:#cfc;"
| 3
| May 27
| Phoenix
| 
| Anthony Davis (34)
| Davis, Drummond (11)
| LeBron James (9)
| Staples Center7,825
| 2–1
|-style="background:#fcc;"
| 4
| May 30
| Phoenix
| 
| LeBron James (25)
| LeBron James (12)
| LeBron James (6)
| Staples Center8,025
| 2–2
|-style="background:#fcc;"
| 5
| June 1
| @ Phoenix
| 
| LeBron James (24)
| Andre Drummond (13)
| LeBron James (7)
| Phoenix Suns Arena16,163
| 2–3
|-style="background:#fcc;"
| 6
| June 3
| Phoenix
| 
| LeBron James (29)
| LeBron James (9)
| Gasol, James (7)
| Staples Center8,550
| 2–4

Roster

Transactions

Overview

Trades

Free agency

Re-signed

Additions

Subtractions

References

Notes

External links
2020–21 Los Angeles Lakers at Basketball-Reference.com

Los Angeles Lakers seasons
Los Angeles Lakers
Los Angeles Lakers
Los Angeles Lakers
Lakers
Lakers